Phill Niblock (born October 2, 1933 in Anderson, Indiana) is an American composer, filmmaker, videographer, and director of Experimental Intermedia, a foundation for avant-garde music based in New York with a parallel branch in Ghent, Belgium.

Early life and education
After an early period studying economics (BA, Indiana University, 1956) Niblock came to New York in 1958. Initially he worked as a photographer and filmmaker. Much of this activity centered around photographing and filming jazz musicians and modern dancers. An epiphany occurred while riding a motorcycle in the Carolina mountains. Niblock was climbing a grade behind a slow-moving diesel truck when the revolutions of both vehicles' engines nearly synchronized. "The strong physical presence of the beats resulting from the two engines running at slightly different frequencies put me in such a trance that I nearly rode off the side of the mountain."

Career

Niblock's first musical compositions date from 1968. Unusually, even among the avant-garde composers of his generation, he has no formal musical training. He cites the musical activities of New York in the 1960s (and occasional memorable performances, such as the premiere of Morton Feldman's Durations pieces) as a stimulus. All his compositions are worked out intuitively rather than systematically. His early works were all done with tape, overdubbing unprocessed recordings of precisely tuned long tones played on traditional instruments in four, eight, or sixteen tracks. Since the late 1990s his music has been created with computer technology, notably with Pro Tools on a Macintosh computer. His later works are correspondingly more dense in texture, sometimes involving as many as forty tracks.

Niblock has also made a number of films and videos, including several in a series titled The Movement of People Working. Filmed primarily in rural environments in many countries and regions of the world (China, Brazil, Portugal, Lesotho, Puerto Rico, Hong Kong, the Arctic, Mexico, Hungary, the Adirondacks, Peru), the films look at everyday work, frequently agrarian or marine labor. These films are remarkable for their stark realism, consistent use of long takes, limited camera movement, and striking juxtaposition of non-fiction content and vivid colors. These scenes of the movement of human manual labor are treated abstractly without explicit anthropological or sociological commentary. As in his music, Niblock counters the static surface of the work with an active, varied texture of rhythm and form achieved by the bodies in motion within the frame; this is what Niblock considers to be the ultimate subject matter of his films.

Music style
Niblock's music is an exploration of sound textures created by multiple tones in very dense, often atonal tunings (generally microtonal in conception) performed in long durations. The layering of long tones only very slightly distinct in pitch creates a multitude of beats and generates complex overtone patterns and other fascinating psychoacoustic effects. The combination of apparently static surface textures and extremely active harmonic movement generates a highly original music that, while having things in common with early drone-based Minimalism, is utterly distinct in sound and technique. Niblock's work continues to influence a generation of musicians, especially younger players from a variety of musical genres.

Niblock's compositional process usually begins with recordings of single, absolute tones played by a specific musician, with the breathing and attack and decay edited out; these single tones are then layered, creating a monumental, continuous sound. Collaborations with such musicians have been crucial to his composing life, and the range of musicians with whom he has worked include David Gibson, in the cello works of the 1970s; Petr Kotik, Susan Stenger, and Eberhard Blum, on Four Full Flutes; Rafael Toral, David First, Lee Ranaldo, Thurston Moore, Susan Stenger, and Robert Poss on Guitar Too, for Four (G2,44+1x2); Ulrich Krieger, Carol Robinson, Kaspar T. Toeplitz, and Reinhold Friedl, on Touch Food; Dave Soldier and the Soldier String Quartet on Five More String Quartets, Early Winter; and many others. In the past decade he has produced several works for orchestra: Disseminate, Three Orchids (for three orchestras), Tow for Tom (for two orchestras), and 4 Chorch + 1, the latter a commission for the Ostrava Music Days 2007 for chorus and orchestra with solo baritone (Thomas Buckner). The premieres of all these works have been conducted by Petr Kotik.

In performance, live musicians may play, wandering through the audience changing the sound texture through reinforcement of or interference with the existing tunings. Simultaneously, Niblock generally accompanies performances by presenting his films and videos (often those from The Movement of People Working series, or computer-driven, black-and-white abstract images floating through time). These performances fall into two types: (1) an installation of several hours' duration, with the music pieces played consecutively, with a long loop of several hours of work before repetition, and with multiple images that are shown simultaneously; or (2) a performance, with several simultaneous works of music and film, usually lasting between one and three hours. In these performances Niblock generally projects three (or more) film images simultaneously, on large screens three to four meters wide. The films are 16mm and color. The music is produced from stereo or quad tapes, with four or more speakers in the corners of the space. His more recent video pieces are played individually or with several simultaneously, using large video monitors.

Experimental Intermedia Foundation
Since 1985, Niblock has been the director of the Experimental Intermedia Foundation in New York where he has been an artist-member since 1968. Niblock received a 1994 Foundation for Contemporary Arts Grants to Artists Award and a 2014 Foundation for Contemporary Arts John Cage award. He is the producer of music and Intermedia presentations at EI since 1973 (about 1,000 performances) and the curator of EI's XI Records label. In 1993, he opened a house with window gallery at Sassekaai 45 in Ghent, Belgium, and, in 1997, the coordinating committee—Phill Niblock, Maria Blondeel, Zjuul Devens, Lieve D'hondt, and Ludo Engels—founded a Belgian organization, the Experimental Intermedia v.z.w., Ghent. He taught at the College of Staten Island, a CUNY school, from 1971 to 1998.

Phill Niblock's music is available on the XI, Moikai, Mode Records, and Touch labels. A double-sided DVD of films and music, lasting nearly four hours, is available on the Extreme label.

Discography
Working Touch, 2022.
Touch Five, 2013.
Touch Strings, 2009.
G2 44 +/X 2, 2006.
Touch Three, 2006.
Disseminate, 2004.
The Movement of People Working (DVD), 2003
Touch Food, 2003.
Touch Works, for Hurdy Gurdy and Voice, 2000.
A Young Person’s Guide to Phill Niblock (or short: YPGPN), 1994.
Music by Phill Niblock, 1993
Four Full Flutes, 1990.

Filmography & Videography
Morning (1966-67, B&W, 16mm, 17 min., sound)
The Magic Sun (1966-68, B&W, 16mm, 17 min., sound) with Sun Ra
Max (1966-68, B&W, 16mm, 7:30 min, sound) with Max Neuhaus
Annie (1968, color, 16mm, 8 min., sound)
Dog Track (1969, color, 16mm, 8.5 min., sound)
Raoul (1968-69, color, 16mm, 20 min., sound)
THIR (aka Ten Hundred Inch Radii and Environments IV) (1970, color, 16mm, 45 min., sound)

The Movement of People Working Series (1973-91, color, 16mm unless otherwise indicated, silent):
 Sur Uno and Dos (Mexico and Peru) (45 min.)
 Trabajando Uno and Dos (Mexico) (45 min.)
 Tres Familias: Essex, La Purificacion, and Alpatlahua (90 min.)
 Four Libros (45 min.)
 James Bay (45 min.)
 Arctic (45 min.)
 Hong Kong (45 min.)
 South Africa (45 min.)
 Lesotho (45 min.)
 Portugal (45 min.)
 Brasil 83 (Part 1 & 2) (75 min.)
 Brasil 84 (Part 1 & 2) (90 min.)
 Hungary (Part 1 & 2) (75 min.)
 China 86 (120 min.)
 China 87 (120 min.)
 China 88 (Part 1, 2, & 3) (120 min.)
 Japan 89 (Part 1 & 2) (120 min.)
 Sumatra (video)
 Romania (Part 1) (video)

Poets and Talkers (1975-1988, 16mm & video, 120 min., sound) with Armand Schwerner, Hannah Weiner, Erica Hunt, Dagmar Apel, and Charlie Morrow
Anecdotes from Childhood (1986-92, color, video, sound)
Terrace of Unintelligibility (1988, color, 3/4-inch U-matic video, 20 min, sound) with Arthur Russell (musician), voice, cello
Muna Torso (1992, color, video, 20 min, sound)
Topolo 1 (2005, video, 11 min., silent)
Topolo 2 (2009, video, 15 min., silent)
Remo Osaka 1 (2009, color, SD mini-DV, 75 min., sound)
Remo Osaka 2 (2010, color, SD mini-DV, 105 min., sound)
Meudrone 1 (2013, color, HD video, 30 min., sound)
Meudrone 2 (2014, color, HD video, 30 min., sound)
Vain4 BCN (2015, color, HD video, 19 min., sound)
Agosto NOSND (2017, color, HD video, 19 min., sound)
Pulp Elder A (2018, color, HD video, 5 min., sound)
HookerNiblock (2015-19, color, HD video, 18 min., sound) with William Hooker (musician), drums

References

External links
 Phill Niblock.com—Official Web site
 Experimental Intermedia Web site
 Phill Niblock at 85: Austere, Unpopular, Astounding Minimalism (at Second Inversion)
 Article at HyperReal
 Interview with Phil Niblock (2006) in FO A RM Magazine, Issue 4
 Interview with Phill Niblock by Bob Gilmore (2007) in Paris Transatlantic Magazine
 Sample MP3
 Phill Niblock interview from American Mavericks site
 Sample from The Movement of People Working (QuickTime file, 11.3 MB)
 "Ghosts and Others," a rare phonographic collage by Niblock (CD supplement, FO A RM Magazine, Issue #4, 2006)
 Phill Niblock at Arcane Candy

1933 births
Living people
20th-century classical composers
21st-century classical composers
American male classical composers
American classical composers
Blast First artists
American experimental musicians
Musicians from Anderson, Indiana
India Navigation artists
21st-century American composers
20th-century American composers
20th-century American male musicians
21st-century American male musicians
College of Staten Island faculty